Baton Rouge General - Mid City, also known as Mid City or The General, is a long term care, not-for-profit, community-owned hospital located in Baton Rouge, Louisiana.  This hospital, established in the early 1900s, was the first official hospital to operate in the region.  The hospital offers many services, including skilled nursing, wound care, and physical therapy.  The hospital's sister facility is Baton Rouge General Medical Center- Bluebonnet Campus.

Emergency department 
After years of financial struggle and $154 million from the state since 2012, Baton Rouge General announced the imminent closure of the Mid City emergency department on Tuesday, February 3, 2015. Due to the volume of uninsured patients seeking treatment, hospital losses were exceeding $2 million per month. The closure will have a significant impact on travel time for EMS patients in the vicinity, who will now have to be transported to either Lane Regional Medical Center to the north, or Our Lady of the Lake Regional Medical Center and Ochsner Medical Center to the south. This has added additional fuel to the contentious debates over whether Louisiana should accept federal funding through the Patient Protection and Affordable Care Act to expand Medicaid coverage.

References

External links
 Official website

Hospitals in Louisiana
Buildings and structures in Baton Rouge, Louisiana